Topkapı ("cannonball gate"), sometimes spelled Topkapi outside of Turkey, is a Turkish word that may refer to:

 Topkapı Palace, a museum in Istanbul, Turkey
 Topkapı Scroll, a Timurid dynasty pattern scroll in the museum's collection
 Topkapı, Besni, a village in the district of Besni, Adıyaman Province, Turkey
 Topkapı, Fatih, a neighbourhood of Istanbul near the Roman city walls
 Topkapi (film), a 1964 caper movie
 Topkapi (album), a 1965 album by jazz organist Jimmy McGriff 
 Nesrin Topkapı (born 1951), Turkish belly dancer
 Topkapi (previous title The Light of Day (Eric Ambler novel)), a 1962 tragi-comic art heist spy novel by Eric Ambler
 Topkapı, Kemaliye